Roy Perkins (born May 9, 1990) is an American paralympic swimmer who competes in the S5 classification. At the 2008 Summer Paralympics in Beijing, Perkins won one gold and one bronze medal. At the 2012 Summer Paralympics in London, he won two silver and two bronze medals. At the 2016 Summer Paralympics he won one gold and one silver medal.

Perkins was born without hands or feet and first learned to swim when he was 12 years old. He attended The Bishop's School in San Diego and later Stanford University. In 2006, the San Diego Hall of Champions named him its Challenged Athlete Star of the Year.

References

External links 

 
 

1990 births
Living people
American male butterfly swimmers
Paralympic swimmers of the United States
Paralympic gold medalists for the United States
Paralympic silver medalists for the United States
Paralympic bronze medalists for the United States
Swimmers at the 2008 Summer Paralympics
Swimmers at the 2012 Summer Paralympics
Swimmers at the 2016 Summer Paralympics
Medalists at the 2008 Summer Paralympics
Medalists at the 2012 Summer Paralympics
Medalists at the 2016 Summer Paralympics
S5-classified Paralympic swimmers
Paralympic medalists in swimming
Medalists at the World Para Swimming Championships
American male freestyle swimmers
21st-century American people